Machina (also known as Matsena) is a Local Government Area in Yobe State, Nigeria. It shares a border in the north with The Republic of Niger.

It has an area of 1,213 km and a population of 61,606 at the 2006 census.

The postal code of the area is 630.

See also 
 List of Local Government Areas in Yobe State

References

Local Government Areas in Yobe State